V. P. Nandakumar is an Indian businessman hailing from Valapad in Thrissur District of Kerala. He is the managing director and chief executive officer of Manappuram Finance Limited.

He is also the chairman of Asirvad Microfinance, the 4th largest MFI in India with over Rs. 5,000 crore AUM (Assests Under Management).

Personal

V.P.Nandakumar is also the International Director of the Lion's Club International.

References

Living people
Indian industrialists
Businesspeople from Thrissur
Year of birth missing (living people)